The Old St. John's Cemetery lies in the southeastern part of Raadi Cemetery in Tartu, Estonia. It was entered into the National Register of Cultural Monuments on 23 May 1997.

Following a ukase of Russian Empress Catherine II forbidding burials in churches, Vana-Jaani Cemetery was founded in 1773 under the ownership of St. John's Church, and formally opened on 5 November that year. It served as the burial location for St. John's German and Estonian congregations and the Tartu Russian church. However, its name dates to the foundation of the New St. John's Cemetery in Puiestee Street.

There are several buildings of historical value in the cemetery: the family chapel of Mayor Jacob Friedrich Teller, the Rauch-Seidlitz chapel, and the Carl Klein chapel.

Notable burials
Aleksander Adojaan
Villem Alttoa
Betti Alver, Estonian poet, 1906 – 1999
Endel Ani
Ülo Arend
Paul Ariste, Estonian linguist, 1905 – 1990
Lauri Aus, Estonian professional cyclist, 1970 – 2003
Karl Ernst von Baer, Baltic German scientist and explorer, 1792 – 1876
Valeri Bezzubov
Rem Blum

Wilhelm Gottfried Eisenschmidt
Henn Elmet
Villem Ernits
Johann Philipp Gustav Ewers, German legal historian and the founder of Russian legal history, 1779 – 1830
Friedrich Robert Faehlmann, Estonian writer, medical doctor and philologist, 1778 – 1850
Harald Haberman
August Matthias Hagen, Baltic German painter and graphic artis, 1794 – 1878
Julie Wilhelmine Hagen-Schwarz, Baltic German painter, 1824 – 1902
Traugott Hahn
Samuel Gottlieb Rudolf Henzi (stone removed by Sovyets), Swiss linguist, Professor at the University of Tartu, 1794 – 1828
Kaarel Ird
Aino Järvesoo
Epp Kaidu
Ants Kallikorm
Gunnar Kangro
Paul Kard
Elmar Karu
Arnold Kask
Paul Kenkmann
Aksel Kipper
Johann Wilhelm Krause
Friedrich Reinhold Kreutzwald
Fred Kudu
Olevi Kull
Eerik Kumari
Grigori Kuzmin
Kuno Kõrge
Bernhard Eduard Otto Körber
Valter Külvet
Roland Laasmäe
Leo Leesment
Mart Lepik
Artur Lind
Juri Lotman
Johannes Lükki
Jaan Maramaa
Otto Wilhelm Masing
Uku Masing
Johann Karl Simon Morgenstern
Oleg Mutt
Pent Nurmekund
Salme Nõmmik
Uno Palm

Urmas Petti
Rudolf Põldmäe
Leo Päi
Valter Pärtelpoeg
Richard Ritsing
Karl August Senff
Rudolf Säre
Kulno Süvalep
Evald Tordik
Gustav Teichmüller

References

External links

Cemeteries in Estonia
Tartu
1773 establishments in the Russian Empire